Thomas Junghans (born 22 January 1977) is an professional Swiss-German darts player, who competes for the Professional Darts Corporation.

Career
Born in Germany, Junghans works as a mechanic when not playing darts.

His big breakthrough came in the BDO World Masters tournament in 2015, where he reached the semi-finals, before losing to eventual winner Glen Durrant.

References

External links

https://www.swiss-darts.com/players-callers/thomas-junghans/

https://www.playwiththebest.com/darts/team-unicorn/global/thomas-junghans.html

1977 births
Swiss darts players
German darts players
Living people
British Darts Organisation players
Professional Darts Corporation associate players
People from Plauen
Sportspeople from Saxony